The 2019–20 season was Livingston's second consecutive season in the Scottish Premiership, the top flight of Scottish football. Livingston also competed in the Scottish Cup and the League Cup.

On 13 March, the Scottish football season was suspended with immediate effect due to the COVID-19 Coronavirus outbreak. On 18 May, the SPFL declared the end of the season determining on an average points per game with Livi finishing in fifth place.

Season Summary

Gary Holt remained as manager for the season. Livi started the season well by going nine matches unbeaten until they met Rangers in the League, with them also knocking Livi out of the League Cup. Then for the first time in their history Livi earned their maiden win against Celtic in the League. They went on an eight match win-less League run but ended it with a win against Kilmarnock. Lyndon Dykes became the first Livi player to score a top-flight hat-trick against Ross County. Livi were knocked out in the fifth round of the Scottish Cup by Inverness Caledonian Thistle. Their away match at Rangers was postponed and rearranged 24 hours later by the SPFL due to Storm Dennis. They moved up to fifth in the table before all football was suspended due to COVID-19 Coronavirus outbreak. On 9 April, the Scottish football season was further suspended until at least 10 June. Livi shortly after released a statement saying they would support a decision to finish the league early. On 18 May, the SPFL finished the league.

Results & fixtures

Pre-season

Scottish Premiership

League Cup

Scottish Cup

Squad statistics

Appearances

|-
|colspan="10"|Players who left the club during the season
|-

|}

Robby McCrorie used squad No. 23 for one match against St Johnstone. He used No. 1 after.

Team statistics

League table

League cup table

Transfers

Transfers In

Transfers Out

See also
List of Livingston F.C. seasons

Footnotes

References

Livingston F.C. seasons
Livingston